Jean Marie Joseph Philippe (18 March 1905 – 4 February 1993), in religion Thomas Philippe, was a French Dominican priest. Along with Jean Vanier, he co-founded the communities of L'Arche, an organisation which helps support people with mental disabilities. Both he and Vanier were later found to be sexual abusers. 

Philippe also taught theology and philosophy, and conducted preaching, retreats, and gave spiritual direction (the latter being the setting of his abusive behavior).

Biography
Philippe was the third of twelve children born to Henri Ignace Louis Joseph Philippe (1875–1959) and Élisabeth Marie Joseph Dehau (1878–1968).

He taught theology at Le Saulchoir and at the Angelicum (the Pontifical University of Saint Thomas Aquinas in Rome), then animated different religious communities, including l'Eau Vive (living water). It was through the l'Eau Vive community in 1950 that Phillipe met Jean Vanier and founded the l'Arche community in 1964. Vanier called Philippe his "spiritual father". In 1963, Thomas was the chaplain for Val Fleuri (flowered valley), a community of men with mental disabilities in Trosly-Breuil. Val Fleuri was later integrated into l'Arche.

Thomas Philippe is one of Marthe Robin's relatives. His conversations with Tim Guénard led to Guénard's conversion to Catholicism.

Philippe died on 4 February 1993 at the priory of Saint-Jodard, where the Brothers of Saint John looked after him in his old age. It was his brother, Marie-Dominique Philippe, who discovered him dead and then celebrated his funeral in Trosly-Breuil. He was buried near the chapel at the Ferme de Trosly-Breuil, where he had inspired Jean Vanier in the founding of the communities of l'Arche.

Strife at Le Saulchoir
Paul Weindling, in his 2010 book, said:
Thomas Philippe ... inspired vibrant spirituality and social activism, standing in the Dominican tradition of saving souls through preaching while looking to the very earliest Christian communities.
...
Père Thomas clashed with the philosophically innovative Père Marie-Dominique Chenu, who was Régent of Studies at the Studium Generale of Le Saulchoir from 1932 until debunked in 1942. ... In 1937 Chenu's tract Une école de théologie: Le Saulchoir was condemned for challenging papal authority and split the ranks of the Thomists at the Saulchoir. ...
The Angelicum in Rome ordered young Père Thomas "to put things right" by debunking Père Chenu. ... Thomas Philippe ousted Chenu as Régent at Le Saulchoir in June 1942. ... Chenu's condemnation meant his fellow Dominicans resented Père Thomas, who tried to bring about a fusion of the metaphysical and the mystical, but he realized that he could not change the rank and file at Le Saulchoir, who were loyal to Chenu.

Sexual abuse of nuns
Thomas Philippe and his brother, Marie-Dominique Philippe (also a priest) were accused of having sexual relations with several nuns for more than 20 years.

In 1956, following a canonical investigation, Rome forbade Philippe to exercise any priestly ministry and in particular spiritual guidance, but Dominican archives show that he ignored that prohibition.

In 2015, a second canonical instruction validated by Mgr Pierre d'Ornellas, Archbishop of Rennes, said that Philippe was guilty of sexual abuse in the context of spiritual guidance of adult women. According to this document, fourteen people (two witnesses and twelve victims) were heard, confirming the facts of abuse which took place from the 1970s until 1991. “Father Thomas committed sexual acts against adult women, by which he said to seek and communicate a mystical experience”, reads the document "They attest to a psychological and spiritual hold on these women to whom he asked for silence because, according to him, this corresponded to special graces 'that no one could understand' ". The canonical investigation confirmed that these testimonies were trustworthy.

In early 2016, the association Aid to Victims of deviant Religious movements in Europe and their Families (AVREF) published the testimony of a former Carmelite nun. In the document, she tells in a detailed manner the story of her sexual relationships with Philippe. The publication of this first testimony prompted two other women to testify in turn a few weeks later with AVREF in which they very explicitly confirm that Philippe had sexual relations with them.

The L'Arche community recognized the truth of the facts and communicated on the L'Arche international website. Several nuns -- victims of the sexual abuse of Phillipe and his brother (Marie-Dominique Philippe, also a priest) -- testified in a documentary broadcast on Arte and on Radio Télévision Suisse (RTS).

In February 2020, L'Arche International issued its Summary Report, being a summary of the full report by GCPS Consulting (a UK-based group with expertise in the prevention of sexual exploitation and abuse) and the historical work by Antoine Mourges, concerning alleged or proven sexual abuse of women by Thomas Philippe and Jean Vanier.

A defense of Thomas Philippe and Marie-Dominique Philippe has been published online by their niece Marie Philippe.

Books

In English
  384 pages.
 The Fire of Contemplation: A Guide for Interior Souls, translated and edited by sister Verda Clare Doran, CSC. New York, Alba House, 1981.
  Forewords by Henri J. M. Nouwen and Jean Vanier. 144 pages.
  175 pages.

In French
 Prayer, 1974.
 The Heart of God, the Heart of Man, Trosly-Breuil, Les Chemins de l'Arche-la Ferme, 1987, 204 p.
 The wheat is already white for the harvest: the Lion of Judah at the heart of a new community, Paris, Le Sarment / Fayard / Éditions du Lion de Juda, 1987, 207 p.
 Fidelity to the Holy Spirit, Nouan-le-Fuzelier, Éditions du Lion de Juda, 1988, 281 p.
 Crumbs for all: advice for the interior life and prayer of the heart, Paris, Éditions Saint-Paul, 1994, 219 p.
 The quarter of an hour of prayer, Paris, Éditions Saint-Paul, 1994, 31 p.
  31 pages.
 Paths of light in children, Paris, Éditions Saint-Paul, 1994, 31 p.
 The awakening to the love of the little one, Paris, Éditions Saint-Paul, 1994, 31 p.

In Polish
 Wytrwała modlitwa, 1992.
 Wierność Duchowi Świętemu, 1994.
 Drogi światła u dziecka, 1998.
 Nowa dojrzałość u najstarszych, 1998.
 Czas żywotnych sił u nastolatka, 1998.
 Mądrość różańca, 2002.
 Obieram Cię dzisiaj, Maryjo, 2002.
 Okruchy: rady dotyczące życia wewnetrznego i modlitwy serca, 2002.

References

See also
Religieuses abusées, l'autre scandale de l'Église

1905 births
1993 deaths
French Dominicans
People from Nord (French department)
Catholic Church sexual abuse scandals in France
Sexual abuse of women in the Catholic Church
Sexual abuse scandals in Catholic orders and societies